Quezon Huskers are a professional basketball team based in Quezon, Philippines. The Huskers play in the Maharlika Pilipinas Basketball League (MPBL). The team has played in United Regional Basketball League (URBL) from 2004 to 2005 as Quezon Coco Huskers and in the MPBL since 2023. It is owned by the Provincial Government of Quezon.

History
In January 2023, the Maharlika Pilipinas Basketball League announced that the league would be getting a new expansion team for the 2023 MPBL season. Later that month, Quezon Governor Angelina "Helen" Tan announced that the team would be based in Quezon alongside a contest to design the team's branding. The team's name was later revealed as the Quezon Huskers, a reference to Quezon's moniker as the "Coconut Capital of the Philippines".

The team hosted the 2023 season opener at home, where they faced off against fellow expansion team Negros Muscovados. The Huskers pulled off a comeback win to beat the Muscovados, 82–80.

Current roster

Head coaches
Eric Gonzales (2023–present)

Season-by-season records

References

 

 
Maharlika Pilipinas Basketball League teams
2004 establishments in the Philippines